Broken City is a 2013 American neo-noir crime thriller film directed by Allen Hughes and written by Brian Tucker. Mark Wahlberg stars as a police officer turned private investigator and Russell Crowe as the mayor of New York City who hires the private detective to investigate his wife.

This is Hughes' first solo feature film directing effort; in previous productions he collaborated with his twin brother Albert. Under a partnership between Emmett/Furla Films and Regency Enterprises, Hughes began production in 2011 in New York City and Louisiana.

It received negative reviews from critics and grossed $19 million against its $35 million production budget.

Plot
NYPD police officer Billy Taggart is arrested for the murder of Mikey Tavarez, who was believed to have raped and murdered 16-year-old Yesenia Barea but avoided a conviction due to a technicality. Chief Carl Fairbanks goes to Mayor of New York City Nicholas Hostetler with a witness and evidence incriminating Taggart, but Hostetler buries the evidence. A judge clears Taggart as having shot Tavarez in self-defense. In a private meeting with Taggart, the mayor calls him "a hero" but still forces him to leave the police department.

Seven years later, Taggart is living with his girlfriend Natalie Barrow, an aspiring actress. His private detective business is on the verge of bankruptcy when Mayor Hostetler hires him to investigate his wife, Cathleen Hostetler, whom he suspects is having an affair. With his assistant Katy Bradshaw, Taggart learns that Cathleen is visiting Paul Andrews, who is the campaign manager of Jack Valliant, Hostetler's rival in the upcoming elections. At a fundraiser for Hostetler's campaign, Cathleen reveals to Taggart that she knows he has been following her and advises him not to trust her husband. Taggart gives the mayor photos of Cathleen meeting with Andrews.

At the debut screening of Natalie's film, she reveals that her real name is Natalia Barea and that Yesenia was her sister. Taggart is shocked at Natalie's sex scene and strongly disapproves. Consumed with guilt over working for Hostetler, Taggart drinks excessively and argues with Natalie, and she breaks off the relationship. He receives a phone call from Katy and rushes to a crime scene to learn that Andrews has been found murdered.

Taggart tells Fairbanks, now the commissioner, of his work for the mayor. They learn that Valliant was in Andrews' apartment. Valliant reveals that Andrews was scheduled to meet Todd Lancaster, the son of Hostetler's wealthy benefactor, contractor Sam Lancaster. A furious Cathleen tells Taggart that Andrews was a close friend, not her lover, and had promised her information about Hostetler's plans for the Bolton Village Housing Project, expected to enrich both Sam Lancaster and the mayor. Hostetler wanted to discover Cathleen's source, so he manipulated Taggart into tracking her.

Taggart decides to investigate Mayor Hostetler for corruption. He goes to Lancaster's construction business and finds workers destroying documents. Stealing some, he discovers that Bolton Village has been sold to build high-rise office buildings, rather than a new housing development, leaving hundreds homeless while Hostetler and Lancaster profit. Taggart is pursued in a car chase by Hostetler's men, who run him off the road and take back the documents. Taggart then visits Todd Lancaster, who says he had intended to give Andrews a copy of the demolition contract as evidence against Hostetler on the night Andrews was murdered, and gives Taggart the contract. Taggart confronts Mayor Hostetler, who is unfazed, and reveals a video showing Taggart murdering Tavarez in cold blood. Taggart records their conversation of the mayor admitting to his own corrupt dealings.

Despite the risk of further prosecution for Taverez's murder, Taggart turns the recording over to Fairbanks. While Hostetler is at home celebrating a successful debate, Fairbanks arrives to arrest him and tells the mayor that he was having an affair with Cathleen. In the film's final scene, Taggart meets Fairbanks at a bar, and they toast to Valliant, who has won the election. Katy comes in to say goodbye before the two men leave the bar.

Cast
 Mark Wahlberg as Billy Taggart
 Russell Crowe as Mayor Nicholas Hostetler
 Catherine Zeta-Jones as Cathleen Hostetler
 Barry Pepper as Jack Valliant
 Kyle Chandler as Paul Andrews
 Natalie Martinez as Natalie Barrow
 Jeffrey Wright as Carl Fairbanks
 Alona Tal as Katy Bradshaw
 Michael Beach as Tony Jansen
 James Ransone as Todd Lancaster
 Griffin Dunne as Sam Lancaster
 Justin Chambers as Ryan Blake
 Gregory Jbara as Mike
 Dana Gourrier as Cop

Production
Broken City was directed by Allen Hughes and written by Brian Tucker. In May 2008, Mandate Pictures bought Tucker's unsolicited screenplay intending to hire a director and cast to film later in the year. In the following July, Mandate entered a deal with the production company Mr. Mudd to jointly produce one film per year, the first being Broken City. The companies aimed to hire the cast and crew by late 2008. Production did not commence as planned, and the project remained in an incomplete state of development. It became part of the film industry's 2008 black list of "best, albeit unproduced, screenplays."

Allen Hughes was attached to direct. By the following October, Regency Enterprises joined the project to co-finance with Emmett/Furla Films. Variety reported that Regency founder Arnon Milchan wanted to produce "edgier fare" like it previously did with the 1990s films Heat and L.A. Confidential. This would be Hughes' first feature film directing effort without his twin brother Albert. (Allen also directed the TV movie Knights of the South Bronx (2005) and a few episodes of the American version of the TV series Touching Evil.) Hughes said about working on his own, "The issue is learning that you're going to be in a room sometimes, and there's going to be eight guys assaulting you, creatively. Back in the day, when it was me and him, they could have had 15 people in the room, and they were all getting laid out." He met Tucker in 2010 at the Palm restaurant in West Hollywood, where he learned about the screenwriter's Broken City.

Filming also took place in the Carrollton neighborhood of New Orleans and in other parts of Louisiana.

Release
The film competed with fellow openers Mama and The Last Stand, as well as Silver Linings Playbook in its widening release. The Los Angeles Times said the film drew "the most interest from older audiences".

Prior to Broken Citys release, Variety reported that the film was estimated to have "a low to mid-teens opening" weekend. It grossed  on Friday through Sunday, ranking fifth. It grossed  through the holiday (Martin Luther King, Jr. Day) on Monday. Broken City grossed  in the United States and Canada.

Home media
Broken City was released on DVD and Blu-ray on April 30, 2013.

Critical reception
On review aggregator website Rotten Tomatoes, the film holds an approval rating of 28% based on 153 reviews, with an average rating of 4.70/10. The site's critics consensus reads: "Broken City'''s thinly sketched, formulaic script offers meager rewards for all but the least demanding noir aficionados." Metacritic gives the film a weighted average score of 49 out of 100, based on 38 critics, indicating "generally unfavorable reviews". Audiences polled by CinemaScore gave the film an average grade of "B" on an A+ to F scale.

Emily Helwig wrote for The Hollywood Reporter, critics "have been less than thrilled" with Broken City. "While many praise the talented cast and others enjoyed the cinematography, some critics add that Brian Tucker's screenplay might have been the problem and that it may have been a better story told as a period piece." 
Michael Phillips of the Chicago Tribune'' praises the cinematography of Ben Seresin, describing it as having an "autumnal glow", but criticizes the "coincidence and improbability" of the script, which lets down the able cast. Richard Roeper gave it 3 out of 4 stars, criticizing the script but saying, "It's pretty trashy and sometimes stupid. But there was never a moment when I wasn't entertained on one level or another."

See also
List of films featuring fictional films

References

External links
 
 

2013 films
2013 crime drama films
2013 crime thriller films
2013 thriller drama films
2010s English-language films
2010s political thriller films
20th Century Fox films
Adultery in films
American crime drama films
American crime thriller films
American detective films
American political thriller films
American thriller drama films
Black Bear Pictures films
Films about elections
Films about the New York City Police Department
Films directed by the Hughes brothers
Films produced by Mark Wahlberg
Films scored by Atticus Ross
Films set in New York City
Films shot in Louisiana
Films shot in New York City
MoviePass Films films
Mr. Mudd films
Regency Enterprises films
Films produced by Arnon Milchan
2010s American films